James Baird may refer to:

 Sir James Baird, 2nd Baronet ( 1658–1715), British baronet
 James Baird (British Army officer) (1915–2007)
 James Baird (civil engineer) (1872–1953), builder of the Lincoln Memorial and quarterback of the Michigan Wolverines football team
 James Baird (footballer) (born 1983), Scottish goalkeeper/soccer player
 James Baird (industrialist) (1802–1876), Scottish industrialist and MP for Falkirk Burghs
 James Baird (merchant) (1828–1915), Newfoundland merchant and activist
 James Baird (trade unionist), Northern Irish politician and activist
 James Bryson Baird (1859–1939), Canadian politician
 Jim Baird (American football), American college football player of the 1890s
 Jim Baird (Australian footballer) (1920–2003), Australian rules footballer
 Jim Baird (politician) (born 1945), U.S. representative from Indiana

See also
 James Baird State Park in New York